Aaron Drake Anderson (born June 10, 1991) is an American professional basketball player who last played for the Södertälje Kings of the Swedish Basketligan. He won the Swedish championship with the Kings in 2015 and 2016. Anderson led the Liga Portuguesa de Basquetebol in rebounds during the 2013–2014 season.

College
Anderson played at Kennesaw State University in Kennesaw, Georgia, during his collegiate career and left as the schools all-time leader in rebounds.

Playing career
Anderson had a workout with the Phoenix Suns in 2013 but ended up going undrafted in the 2013 NBA Draft.

In September 2013, Anderson signed with CAB Madeira of the Liga Portuguesa de Basquetebol. For the 2013–2014 season, he averaged 12.5 points and league leading 12.2 rebounds  and was named to the All-League second-team and to the All-Import team.

Anderson signed with Czech club Sluneta Ústí nad Labem in August 2014 but was released shortly later. A month later, he signed with reigning Swedish champions Södertälje Kings of the Basketligan. On April 21, 2015, Anderson was accused of racist remarks by Uppsala Basket's Brice Massamba. The leagues disciplinary board did not find any evidence of the accusations and thus did not hand out any penalties. He won the Swedish championship with the Kings in 2015 and 2016.

References

External links
 Profile on eurobasket.com
 Profile on realgm.com
 Basketligan profile at basketliganherr.se

1991 births
Living people
American expatriate basketball people in Portugal
American expatriate basketball people in Sweden
American men's basketball players
Basketball players from Tucson, Arizona
CAB Madeira players
Central Arizona Vaqueros men's basketball players
Kennesaw State Owls men's basketball players
Södertälje Kings players
Forwards (basketball)